Mulinia cleryana is a species of medium-sized saltwater clam, a marine bivalve mollusc in the family Mactridae. This species occurs in the Caribbean Sea and the western Atlantic Ocean as far south as Brazil.

References

Mactridae
Bivalves described in 1846